Alexander Nikolayevich Komin (Aleksandr Nikolayevich Komin; July 15, 1953 – June 15, 1999), known as The Slaveholder (Rabovladyelyets), was a Russian slave-owner and serial killer. At various times from 1995 to 1997, he kept 6 people as prisoners in a 9-meter deep bunker under his own garage. Four of his prisoners were eventually murdered.

Komin was featured in several documentaries, including "Cooperative Prisoner" (1998) from the series "Criminal Russia", "Bunker. The modern version" (2015) from the series "The investigation was conducted..." and a documentary film which appeared on Japanese television from the series "Maniacs of the 20th century".

Life before the construction of the bunker 
Komin was born on July 15, 1953 in Vyatskiye Polyany, where he subsequently committed all of his crimes. Having graduated from an 8-grade school, Komin was sentenced to 3 years imprisonment for hooliganism at the age of 18. While serving his sentence in a penal colony, Komin worked at the colony's garment factory. The work of a tailor pleased him so much that, after his release, he graduated from college in this specialty. However, it was hard for Komin to fulfill his ambitions in a small town, so he worked as a watchman, an electrician and a handyman as well.

As Komin later explained, while serving his sentence, he met a prisoner who was convicted of holding several homeless people in his basement, forcing them to work for him. He enjoyed the idea of having unlimited power over others, so Komin wanted to experience the same thing.

Creation of the bunker 

To start, Komin needed a reliable partner. Soon, while working on the night shift, he suggested to his colleague, Alexander Mikheev, and he agreed. Initially, Komin only planned to organize a greenhouse with electric heating in the bunker, in which vegetables would be grown. Subsequently, Komin and Mikheev planned to sell them in a cafe. According to their plan, they would not work there, but forced laborers would.

Komin no longer had a car, and never sold his garage. Soon, he came up with a new idea - to create his own sewing production. After almost four years under the garage, the companions were digging an underground bunker, where they arranged several rooms, conducted electricity, ventilation, and even made a winch that performed the role of an elevator, and by early 1995, their underground prison was ready.

The first victims 
Soon the search for future slaves began, with the ideal option being a young, lone dressmaker. For a while Komin and Mikheev walked around the city looking for potential workers in the market and at the station, but without success. On January 13, 1995, near a school on Gagarin Street, Komin met a woman named Vera Talpayeva, whom he offered to celebrate the Old New Year in good company. Komin brought her to the garage. There, he gave her a drink of vodka, which had clonidine laced in it.

Talpayeva could not sew, and did not want to learn. She, however, pointed Komin to the tailor Tatiana Melnikova, who would become the next prisoner. She did not remember Melnikova's address exactly, and only recalled the street - Parokhodnaya. Going on a search, Komin unexpectedly met his fellow prisoner named Nikolai Malykh. In an incredible coincidence, he turned out to be a cohabitant of Melnikova. Suggesting that they both go celebrate the meeting, he gave Malykh vodka laced with clonidine. However, Komin realised that Malykh, knowing the laws of the criminal world, would never have started working for him. Komin and Mikheev then stripped him, took him out of the garage and left the unconscious boy in the  His body was discovered in a week.

Work in the underground bunker and new victims 
Melnikova began sewing for Komin dressing gowns and shorts, which he successfully sold in markets and enterprises. In parallel, the construction of the bunker continued, where Talpayeva was an auxiliary worker. However, there was not much use for it, and therefore Komin decided to get a prisoner for the earthworks. On March 21, 1995, at a shop in Uritsky Street, Komin and Mikheev met a strong but alcoholic 37-year-old Yevgeny Shishov. He agreed to a free drink and soon found himself in the bunker. Komin figured out that Shishov was an electrician. Komin could not allow any of his prisoners to figure out the electrical junctions of the bunker and cut off the ladder from the current. For the execution of Shishov, he made an electric chair of his own design: he wrapped his legs and hands with bare wires, plugged them into an outlet and made Talpayeva and Melnikova push two switches at the same time. As Mikheev later said: "He was like this: 'Aaa!'...And everything...You know, quickly...". Shishov's body was lifted on a hoist to the top, taken to the forest and then buried.

Work in the bunker continued, but Melnikova alone could not satisfy Komin's increased appetite, and he then released Talpayeva to help find him a new prisoner. Komin's calculation here was also accurate - he knew that, being an accomplice in the murder of Shishov, she would not betray him.

On July 16, 1995, Talpayeva brought another future prisoner to the garage - Tatiana Kozikova. Ironically, after five days in it she was to be held in court for petty theft, and, without waiting for it, was immediately in "prison". Melnikova taught Kozikova the basics of tailoring, and soon the garment factory had a full working force.

Komin was merciless - the slaves had to work 16 hours  a day, and he had incredible standards: for example, they had to sew 32 dressing gowns per day. Then Melnikova and Kozikova decided to escape. However, the implementation of the plan was made difficult by the fact that it was open and the staircase was cut off from the current only when Komin was inside. Having a perfect opportunity, they locked Komin in one of the rooms, jamming the door with a frying pan. However, they did not manage to escape - Komin broke out and caught them. He offered them a choice - either he cut their mouths to the ears, or would stamp "РАБ" (rab, Russian for "slave") on their faces. They chose the latter, and Komin did it. From now on, the regime was toughened - now, when Komin entered the garage, he signaled a light bulb, and the prisoners had to put on their collars and shackles, and put the keys on a table.

Meanwhile, Talpayeva had to look for new prisoners, but she unexpectedly disappeared. Deciding that she had left town, Komin himself continued the search. While visiting the station, he drew attention to a young woman - 27-year-old Tatyana Nazimova, who had been a homeless person for several years, travelling around different stations of the Gorky Railway. The food and lodging offered by an amiable stranger was to her an unexpected gift of fate, and soon another prisoner appeared in the bunker. However, Komin soon realised that this time he was mistaken. Nazimova was seriously ill mentally and physically, so he and Mikheev only had use for her as a lover. A year later, however, Komin became bored with his companion, and after leaving her without food for several days, he eventually killed her with brake fluid.

Komin laid Nazimova's corpse on a sled and drove to the city morgue, wishing to leave it at the entrance, but two hundred meters from the garage, he was frightened by an accidental passer-by, he threw the corpse and fled.

Komin tried to realize one more of his dreams - growing cucumbers in a greenhouse with electric heating. But as soon as the prisoners gathered their first harvest, a neighbor complained to Komin that he suddenly felt the heat from the garage cellar, and Komin then began to grow potatoes. However, eventually all of the agronomical experiments were stopped.

Komin's ordinary life 
During this time, Komin appeared to live quite an ordinary life. He lived in an apartment on Shkolnaya Street, along with his concubine, but at the same time he visited his garage daily. Neither Komin's partner, nor his neighbors suspected that any unnatural activities were going on in the garage, which for a long time had no car. Also, Komin was registered as unemployed in the public employment service, and regularly received unemployment benefits.

Komin was engaged in public activities, and at this time he was already at the zenith of entrepreneurial success. In addition to the usual products of the garment factory, now the slaves began to sew phelonions for local priests, and even wove icons. Komin also forced them to weave a huge coat of arms of Russia, which he tried to sell to the Vyatskiye Polyana administration and even to the local police, but was refused.

The factory's final year 
In January 1997, Komin unexpectedly met the missing Vera Talpayeva in the city. He offered her new conditions for cooperation: now she had to look for markets for the garment factory's products for an appropriate reward, and also to bring in new prisoners. A few days later Talpayeva brought into the garage 22-year-old Irina Ganyushkina, whom Komin later tried to artificially fertilize (with the help of a syringe), in order to literally begin to grow new slaves for himself. There, in the garage, with the use of the same brake fluid he killed Talpayeva, but unlike Nazimova, he tormented her for several hours before that.

Arrest, trial and sentence 
Komin's arrest was due to his own mistake. He fell in love with Ganyushkina, and wanted to formalize an official marriage with her. Kozikova and Melnikova, realizing that this was their chance to escape, persuaded Ganyushkina to agree. Komin threatened to deal with the 22-year-old woman if she tried to escape. Ganyushkina agreed, but when Komin left her for a few minutes in his apartment unattended, she ran to the police on July 21, 1997. Initially, the employees did not believe the applicant, but when she called the names of those in the bunker, they immediately demanded her to indicate the bunker's location. Komin was arrested near his garage. He tried to stop the electricity in the ladder to try and escape, but Ganyushkina had reported this in advance. After Melnikova and Kozikova were discovered in the bunker they were hospitalized, with both of them wearing a bandage around their eyes, so that they would not be blinded by the sunlight, which they had not seen in two years.

Mikheev was arrested soon after Komin, and began to testify, confessing to four murders, the illegal deprivation of liberty of three more people, the use of slave labor and illegal entrepreneurship.

In 1999, the Kirov Regional Court sentenced Alexander Komin to life imprisonment, and Alexander Mikheev to 20 years imprisonment. After the sentencing, Komin committed suicide in his cell, by cutting open his femoral artery.

See also 
 Viktor Mokhov
 Josef Fritzl case
 Kidnapping of Jaycee Dugard
 Ariel Castro kidnappings
 List of Russian serial killers

References 

1953 births
1999 deaths
1999 suicides
Male serial killers
Prisoners sentenced to life imprisonment by Russia
Russian serial killers
Serial killers who committed suicide in prison custody
Suicides by sharp instrument in Russia